J.C. Moses (October 18, 1936 – 1977) was an American jazz drummer.

He was born John Curtis Moses in Pittsburgh, Pennsylvania, United States, and first began playing around Pittsburgh in the 1950s with Stanley Turrentine and brother Tommy Turrentine.  In the 1960s, he worked with Clifford Jordan, Kenny Dorham and Eric Dolphy. In 1963, he performed and recorded with the New York Contemporary Five, a group that included Archie Shepp, John Tchicai and Don Cherry among its members. In 1964, he played with Tchicai and Roswell Rudd in the New York Art Quartet, and following this with Bud Powell, Charles Lloyd, Roland Kirk, Andrew Hill and Sam Rivers. He moved to Copenhagen around 1969, where he was house drummer at the Montmartre Club, playing with Ben Webster and Dexter Gordon among others. He played less in the 1970s due to failing health, and returned to Pittsburgh, where he played with Nathan Davis and Eric Kloss. He never recorded as a leader.

Moses died in 1977, aged 41.

Discography
With Eric Dolphy
Iron Man  (Douglas, 1963)
Conversations (Fuel, 1963)
The Illinois Concert  (Blue Note, 1963 [1999])
With Kenny Dorham
Matador (United Artists, 1962)
With Andrew Hill
Change (Blue Note, 1966)
With Clifford Jordan
Bearcat (Jazzland, 1962)
With Rahsaan Roland Kirk
Kirk in Copenhagen (Mercury, 1963)
With Charles Lloyd
Discovery! (Columbia, 1964)
With The New York Art Quartet
 Call It Art (Triple Point, 2013)
With Bud Powell
The Return of Bud Powell (Roulette, 1964)
With Joe Sample
Try Us (Sonet, 1969)
With Archie Shepp
Rufus (Fontana, 1963) 
Consequences (Fontana, 1963)
New York Contemporary Five Vol. 1 (Sonet, 1963)
New York Contemporary Five Vol. 2 (Sonet, 1963)
Fire Music (Impulse!, 1965)
On This Night (Impulse!, 1965)
With Marzette Watts
Marzette Watts and Company (ESP-Disk, 1968)
The Marzette Watts Ensemble (Savoy, 1969)

References
Footnotes

General references
Scott Yanow, [ J.C. Moses] at AllMusic

1936 births
1977 deaths
American jazz drummers
Musicians from Pittsburgh
20th-century American drummers
American male drummers
Jazz musicians from Pennsylvania
20th-century American male musicians
American male jazz musicians
New York Contemporary Five members